Line 5 is coloured green on system maps; it is a  regional rail line and has twelve stations. Entering the area of Karaj with main stations at Karaj and Golshahr. It connects with the western end of Line 2 at Tehran (Sadeghiyeh) station. A western extension towards Hashtgerd has been inaugurated in December 2019

The line is also assigned to be Karaj Metro Line 1 in Karaj's 6-line Metro expansion master plan.

Route

References 

Tehran Metro